Larry Lawrence or Laurence may refer to:

Larry Lawrence (gridiron football) (1949–2012), American football quarterback
M. Larry Lawrence (1926–1996), American millionaire and U.S. ambassador to Switzerland
Larry Laurence, pseudonym of Italian American tenor and musical theater performer Enzo Stuarti (1919–2005)